Normae Congregationis (NC) is a 1978 document written by the Vatican's Congregation for the Doctrine of the Faith (CDF) which sets guidelines for Catholic bishops in discerning claims of private revelation such as Marian apparitions. It specifies the manner of discernment and the authorities competent to carry out such discernment.

History 
In November 1974, when the Sacred Congregation for the Doctrine of the Faith (CDF) met for its annual Plenary Congregation, part of the discussion concerned problems relating to reported apparitions and revelations. New developments in theology and psychology prompted questions on how to evaluate claims of such events. The eventual fruit of those discussions was a four-page document in Latin bearing the title "Normae S. Congregationis pro doctrina fidei de modo procedendi in diudicandis praesumptis apparitionibus ac revelationibus" ("Norms of the Sacred Congregation for the Doctrine of the Faith on the Manner of Proceeding in Judging Presumed Apparitions and Revelations"). The document was approved by Pope Paul VI in February 1978 and was signed by Cardinal Franjo Šeper and Archbishop Jean Jérôme Hamer, Who were the prefect and the secretary of the CDF.

The Holy See decided that the text was an "in-house" document intended for bishops, and as such did not need to be published. It was given to bishops "sub secreto" and not published in the Holy See's official journal Acta Apostolicae Sedis. However, excerpts from the text and translations of it appeared in print and on the internet from 1994 to 2010. In 2012, the Congregation for the Doctrine of the Faith released the text to the public in Latin and five vernacular translations with a new preface by Cardinal William Levada, prefect of CDF.

Summary

Chapter 1: Criteria 

The document specifies multiple criteria, both positive and negative, which ecclesial authorities must take into account when making an evaluation of a purported apparition or other private revelation. Positive criteria include reasonable certainty of the factual occurrence of the revelation, positive qualities of the seer (mental balance, honesty, sincerity, moral rectitude, obedience to Church authority, ability to practice the Faith in a normal way apart from the extraordinary phenomena, etc.), accurate theological content of the messages, and the promotion of positive spiritual fruit in people's lives (spirit of prayer, conversion, works of charity that result, etc.).

Negative criteria that serve as "red flags" in the evaluation of an apparition or revelation include inability to establish factual certainty, theological errors in the messages, evidence of the pursuit of financial gain in connection with the alleged revelations, and psychological disorders or grave immorality on the part of the seers or others closely associated with the events.

Chapter 2: Intervention 

The document says that intervention should occur promptly if an alleged supernatural event begins to gather a following. It draws a distinction between private revelation and the devotion that surrounds it, saying that ecclesial authority may authorize the devotion without authorizing the alleged revelation itself. Competent authority should swiftly intervene in the case of clear doctrinal error or other dangers to the faithful, but should exercise reservation in case of doubt.

Chapter 3: Competent Authority 

Primary responsibility falls to the local Ordinary (i.e. the bishop of the place in which the alleged event occurs). If the Ordinary requests it, the area's episcopal conference can intervene. The Holy See can intervene at any time, whether or not it is asked.

Chapter 4: Intervention by the CDF 

When the CDF of the Holy See does intervene—either when asked or of its own accord—it will either choose to assist the existing investigation or take over with its own separate investigation.

See also
 Marian apparition

References

External links
 Normae Congregationis (in Latin)
 Normae Congregationis (in English) (with preface)
 Unofficial 2010 English translation
 Is seeing believing? How the church faces claims of Marian apparitions

Documents of the Congregation for the Doctrine of the Faith
1978 documents
1978 in Christianity
Paranormal